KMJC may mean:

KMJC 620 in Mount Shasta, California
 KMJC-LD, a low-power television station (channel 22, virtual 25) licensed to serve Kansas City, Kansas, United States
previously KECR AM 910 El Cajon, California
now KMXG FM 96.1 Clinton, Iowa, formerly KMJC-FM starting 1989 November 24 or 1990 May 14
now KKLC FM 107.9 in Mount Shasta, California, former KMJC-FM starting 1995 November 1
Koninklijke Marine Jachtclub (Royal Navy Yacht Club) of the Royal Netherlands Navy